Institute for Environment Geochemistry of the National Academy of Sciences of Ukraine (KINR)  located in Kyiv, Ukraine.

History
Decision on creation of the institute with dual subordination to the National Academy of Sciences of Ukraine and the Ministry of Emergencies was adopted on 29 December 1995. On 4 January 1996 a joint order of the Academy and the Ministry was signed by Borys Paton and Volodymyr Kholosha (acting minister) on creation of the State science center of Surrounding Environment Radiation- and Geochemistry based on two departments of the NASU Institute of Geochemistry, Mineralogy, and Ore-creation (Department of surrounding environment radiation- and geochemistry and Department of metallogeny).

On 12 July 2000 the center was renamed as the NASU Institute of [Surrounding] Environment Geochemistry.

In 2012 the Ministry of Emergencies was liquidated (degraded to a state service under Ministry of Internal Affairs).

Directors
 1996 - 2013 Emlen Sobotovych
 2013 - 2018 Heorhiy Lysychenko
 2018 - Yurii L. Zabulonov

Associated entities
 Kyiv science and production association "Ekolohichni tekhnolohiyi i normatyvy" (Ecological technologies and norms)
 State science and production small enterprise "Vidrodzhenia" (Revival)
 State enterprise "Ekoinform"
 Interagency scientific council on issues of radioactive waste management (Presidium of the NASU)
 Committee on meteorites (Department of Earth Sciences of the Presidium of the NASU)
 Branch of the National Aviation University Ecology Department
 The National Aviation University Ecology Department jointly with the National Aviation University Institute of Land Management and Information Technology
 NASU Center for collective use of unique scientific instruments "Mineraloho-heokhimichni doslidzhenia" (Mineral and geochemical research)
 others

References

External links
 NASU Institute of Environment Geochemistry at National Academy of Sciences of Ukraine

Research institutes in Kyiv
Science and technology in Kyiv
Institutes of the National Academy of Sciences of Ukraine
NASU Institute of Physics